The Ruakituri River is a river of the Gisborne and Hawke's Bay Region of New Zealand's North Island. It initially flows northeast from its sources north of Lake Waikareiti. Within its course are the 72 m high Waitangi Falls. It merges with the Hangaroa River resulting in the Wairoa River.

References

See also
 List of rivers of New Zealand

Rivers of the Gisborne District
Rivers of the Hawke's Bay Region
Rivers of New Zealand